Nico Hammann (born 16 March 1988) is a German professional footballer who plays for Hessenliga club SV Unter-Flockenbach as a midfielder or full-back.

External links
 
 

1988 births
People from Eberbach (Baden)
Sportspeople from Karlsruhe (region)
Footballers from Baden-Württemberg
Living people
German footballers
Association football defenders
TSG 1899 Hoffenheim II players
TSV 1860 Munich II players
1. FC Kaiserslautern II players
Arminia Bielefeld players
KSV Hessen Kassel players
1. FC Magdeburg players
SV Sandhausen players
FC Carl Zeiss Jena players
Oberliga (football) players
Regionalliga players
2. Bundesliga players
3. Liga players
Hessenliga players